Mauzac may refer to:

 Mauzac (grape), a grape variety mainly grown in the Limoux and Gaillac regions near Toulouse in France
 Mauzac noir, another wine grape that is grown in Southwest France
 Mauzac, Haute-Garonne, a commune of the Haute-Garonne département in France
 Mauzac-et-Grand-Castang, a commune in the Dordogne department in Nouvelle-Aquitaine in southwestern France